DNA-directed RNA polymerases I and III subunit RPAC1 is a protein that in humans is encoded by the POLR1C gene.

Interactions 

POLR1C has been shown to interact with CD3EAP, POLR1E and POLR1D.

References

Further reading